Soch is a pop and sufi rock band from Lahore, Pakistan. It consists of two members – Adnan Dhool (vocals) and Rabi Ahmad (guitars). The band was formed by the lead vocalist Adnan Dhool in 2010. In 2011, the band released their first single "Bandeya".

Soch was featured in Pakistani music television series Nescafe Basement's Season 1 in 2012. Two years later, the band's critically-acclaimed Nescafe Basement single "Awari" was included in the Bollywood movie Ek Villain in 2014.

History 
In an interview with ARY Digital, Rabi Ahmed revealed that Dhool was looking for a session player for a concert in 2011. That is when they first met and played for the concert. After the concert, they started meeting on and off. Adnan Dhool later offered Rabi Ahmed to join the band, which he accepted.

The band released the tracks "Awari", "Bol Hu", and "Uth Jawana" through a Pakistani music platform Nescafe Basement under the mentorship of Zulfiqar Jabbar Khan, commonly known as Xulfi.

Bollywood director Mohit Suri featured Soch Band's track "Awari" in his 2014 film Ek Villain. Their song "Bol Hu" was included as the title track in the 2020 film Malang.

Soch has composed music for the several Pakistani films including Sherdil, Chupan Chupai, Dekh Magar Pyaar Se, and Verna.

On 22 October 2021, the band released the music video of single "Tera Deewana" on YouTube, which gained 1 million views within a day. On 9 December 2021, the band was included in the lineup for season 14 of Coke Studio, and their song, "Neray Neray Vas", a collaboration with Butt Brothers, was released on 1 February 2022. On 18 December 2021, they produced Ahmad Taha Ghani's debut track titled "Tu Mil Jaye Tou".

Discography

Films

Drama OSTs

Jingles

Anthems

Awards and nominations

 Best Music Life OK Screen Awards 2014
 Nominated for Best Music Direction IIFA Awards 2015

See also 
 List of Pakistani music bands

References

External links 
Official YouTube Channel

Musical groups from Lahore
Pakistani musical groups
Pakistani rock music groups